Didier Pittet (born 20 March 1957 in Geneva, Switzerland) is an infectious diseases expert and the director of the Infection Control Programme and WHO Collaborating Centre on Patient Safety, University Hospital of Geneva, Geneva, Switzerland. Since 2005, Pittet is also the External Lead of the World Health Organization (WHO) Global Patient Safety Challenge "Clean Care is Safer Care" and African Partnerships for Patient Safety.

In the 2007 New Year Honours List, Didier Pittet was awarded the Honorary Commander of the Order of the British Empire (CBE) in recognition of his services related to the prevention of healthcare-associated infections in the UK.

Career
Pittet graduated in 1976 from the Collège Calvin secondary school in Geneva, Switzerland. Following a Diploma in Tropical Medicine and Community Health at the University of Geneva Faculty of Medicine, he graduated as M.D. in 1983 from the same institution, and received a master's degree (MS) in Epidemiology and Public Health from the University of Iowa, Iowa City, US, in 1992. Pittet began his career as an infectious diseases expert with a special interest in the intensive care setting and device-associated and yeast infections, but this rapidly expanded to include research in overall hospital epidemiology and infection prevention and control. In 1992, he was appointed as Director of the Infection Control Programme at the University Hospital of Geneva and named Professor of Medicine in 2000 by the University of Geneva Faculty of Medicine.

Academic and other posts (selected)
Pittet is Visiting Professor, Division of Investigative Science and School of Medicine, Imperial College London, London, UK; Honorary Professor, 1st Medical School of the Fu, Shanghai, China; Honorary Professor, Faculty of Health and Social Sciences, The Hong Kong Polytechnic University, Hong Kong, SAR, China. 
Since 2002, Interscience Conference on Antimicrobial Agents and Chemotherapy (ICAAC) Planning Committee member
Since 2011, Co-Chair, 1st International Conference on Prevention and Infection Control (ICPIC)

Landmark research 
Initial observation studies in Geneva by Pittet's team showed a low compliance with basic hand hygiene practices and a lack of awareness by healthcare workers that the main cause of cross-transmission of microorganisms is by hands. Time constraint was identified as the major determinant for poor compliance. The challenge was to facilitate hand hygiene for staff and to find an innovative idea to do so. Under Pittet's leadership, the team investigated concepts from the social sciences to help understand the determinants driving healthcare worker behaviour, which led to the creation of a multimodal strategy based on education, recognition of opportunities for hand hygiene, and feedback on performance where the key component was the introduction of alcohol-based hand rub at the point of care to replace handwashing at the sink ("system change"), thus bypassing the time constraint of the latter method.

"The Geneva Hand Hygiene Model": a breakthrough intervention  
The first multimodal intervention ran from 1995 to 2000 at the University of Geneva Hospitals with a spectacular decrease of almost 50% in hospital-associated infections and methicillin-resistant Staphylococcus aureus (MRSA) transmission in parallel with a sustained improvement in compliance with hand hygiene. The methodology and results were published in The Lancet in 2000 and the strategy became known in as "The Geneva Hand Hygiene Model". During 1995–1997, Pittet had applied the same multimodal concept to a prevention strategy targeted at vascular access care and showed that it can decrease these infections and substantially impact on the overall incidence of all intensive care unit-acquired infections. Similarly, interventions to reduce urinary tract infections were successfully applied. Pittet's team also proved the cost-effectiveness of their interventions and long-term sustainability. Pittet's vision is that to advance infection prevention and control strategies, it is essential to seek insight and innovation through other specialty fields, such as anthropology or sociology, or even engineering, computer science, mathematical modelling, and systems thinking.

Going global 
In 2004, Pittet was approached by the WHO World Alliance of Patient Safety to lead the First Global Patient Safety Challenge under the banner "Clean Care is Safer Care". The mandate was to galvanise global commitment to tackle health-care associated infection, which had been identified as a significant area of risk for patients in all United Nations Member States. Hand hygiene was to be the cornerstone of the Challenge. As co-author of the United States Centers for Disease Control and Prevention (CDC) Guidelines for Hand Hygiene, Pittet proposed that WHO Guidelines for Hand Hygiene in Health Care be developed under his leadership in consultation with other international experts. The final version of the Guidelines was published in 2009.  In 2008, the infection control programme of the University of Geneva Hospitals and Faculty of Medicine was designated as the first WHO Collaborating Centre for Patient Safety (Infection Control and Improving Practices) in Europe.

The "Geneva Hand Hygiene Model" was used as the basis for the recommended implementation strategy for the global promotion of hand hygiene. As of December 2011, "Clean Care is Safer Care" has been endorsed by ministers of health in over 120 countries worldwide―representing a coverage of more than 90% of the world population. Forty-two countries/networks have already started hand hygiene initiatives using the proposed strategy. Alcohol-based hand rub is promoted actively as the new standard of care, including in resource-poor countries. Pittet's team developed the "Five Moments" concept to explain to healthcare workers the critical moments when hand hygiene must be carried out and this model is currently used worldwide. Save Lives: Clean Your Hands is the Challenge's annual campaign with almost 15,000 hospitals registered from more than 150 countries at the end of December 2011.

Selected awards and honours 
 1999: 1st Ignaz Philipp Semmelweis Research Prize (accomplishments in the field of hand hygiene)
 1999: The Hygiene Prize 1999 - Rudolf Schülke Foundation (accomplishments in the field of infection control)
 2002: Society of Health Care Epidemiology of America (SHEA) Young Investigator Award in recognition of outstanding career contributions to infection control and healthcare epidemiology
 2003: The Lowbury Lecture, Federation of Infection Societies Annual Conference (UK)
 2005: The Graham Ayliffe Lecture (Hospital Infection Society), UK
 2007: Honorary Commander of the Order of the British Empire (CBE)
 2008: Society for Healthcare Epidemiology of America (SHEA) Lectureship
 2008: Forbes Fellow, Melbourne Infectious Diseases Group (Australia)
 2009: European Society of Clinical Microbiology and Infectious Diseases (ESCMID) Award for Excellence in Clinical Microbiology and Infectious Diseases
 2009: Hsu-Li Distinguished Lectureship in Epidemiology, University of Iowa (USA)

Selected videos 
Hand hygiene dance video based on the "My five moments for hand hygiene" concept. "Ô les mains", VigiGerme, Infection Control Programme, University of Geneva Hospitals. 2010.

Save Lives: Clean Your Hands. Professor Didier Pittet hand hygiene advocacy video – 2011.

Main research interests, 1991–2011 
Between 1991 and 2011, Pittet and his collaborators made significant contributions to different research fields. Five key references have been selected for each of the following main research topics:

 Infection prevention as a global priority
 Infection and infection prevention in low- and middle-income economies
 Noma – the disease of poverty
 Epidemiology, surveillance, and international health
 Hand hygiene in healthcare
 Hand hygiene and Semmelweis
 Hand hygiene – dynamics of hand colonization
 Hand hygiene – alcohol-based handrubs as the universal gold standard
 Hand hygiene guidelines
 Hand hygiene education
 Patients as partners in care
 Multimodal interventions to reduce infections
 Nosocomial bloodstream infection
 Catheter-associated infections
 Ventilator-associated pneumonia
 Infections in the critically ill
 Systemic inflammatory response syndrome (SIRS), sepsis, severe sepsis and their cascades
 Infections due to Candida spp
 Epidemiology of methicillin-resistant Staphylococcus aureus (MRSA)
 MRSA control
 Paediatric infection control
 Bone and foreign body infections
 World Health Organization Clean Care is Safer Care and SaveLives: Cleanyourhands [access to references at: ]
 World Health Organization African Partnerships for Patient Safety [access to references at: ]

Publications 

 Top ten peer-reviewed publications
Pittet is author/co-author of approximately 500 publications, including 300 peer-reviewed publications and 50 chapters in authoritative medical textbooks.

 Selected chapters

Pittet D, Harbarth S. The intensive care unit. In: Hospital Infections. Brachman PS and Bennett JV, eds, 5th ed. Lippincott Williams & Wilkins, Philadelphia; 2007.
Pittet D, Allegranzi B, Sax H. Hand hygiene. In: Hospital Infections. Brachman PS and Bennett JV, eds, 5th ed. Lippincott Williams & Wilkins, Philadelphia; 2007.
Allegranzi B, Longtin Y, Pittet D. Infection control in the healthcare setting. In: Control of Communicable Diseases Manual. Heymann DL (ed), 19th ed. American Public Health Association, Washington, DC, USA. 2008.
Sax H, Pittet D. Severe soft-tissue infections. In: Oh's Manual for Intensive Care Medicine. Bersten A, Sony N, Oh T, eds. 6th ed. Butterworth-Heinemann (Elsevier Ltd), London, UK, chap 63, pp 731–737, 2009.
Boyce J, Pittet D. Improving hand hygiene in healthcare settings. In: SHEA Practical Handbook for Healthcare Epidemiologists. 3rd ed. Lautenbach E, Woeltje F, Malani PN (eds). University of Chicago Press, 2010.

 Infection prevention as a global priority

 Infection and infection prevention in low- and middle-income economies

 Noma, disease of poverty

 Epidemiology, surveillance and international health

 Hand hygiene in healthcare

 Hand hygiene and Semmelweis

 Hand hygiene dynamics of hand colonisation

 Hand hygiene alcohol-based handrubs as the universal gold standard

 Hand hygiene guidelines

WHO Guidelines for Hand Hygiene in Health Care (Advanced Draft). World Health Organization, Geneva, 2006

WHO Guidelines for Hand Hygiene in Health Care (Advanced Draft). World Health Organization, Geneva, 2009.

 Hand hygiene education

 Patients as partners in care

 Multimodal interventions to reduce infections

 Nosocomial bloodstream infection

 Catheter-associated infections

 Ventilator-associated pneumonia

 Infections in the critically ill

 Systemic inflammatory response syndrome (SIRS), sepsis, severe sepsis and their cascades

 Infections due to Candida spp.

 Epidemiology of Methicillin-resistant Staphylococcus aureus

 Control of methicillin-resistant Staphylococcus aureus

 Paediatric infection control

 Bone and foreign body infections

World Health Organization Clean Care is Safer Care and SaveLives: CleanYourHands
World Health Organization African Partnerships for Patient Safety

See also
Hand washing

References

Bibliography 
  Thierry Crouzet, Le geste qui sauve, Éditions l'Âge d'homme, 2014, 172 pages.

Honorary Commanders of the Order of the British Empire
World Health Organization officials
Swiss immunologists
1957 births
Living people
Physicians from Geneva
University of Geneva alumni
University of Iowa alumni
Swiss officials of the United Nations